

The Latham 43 was a flying boat bomber built in France in the 1920s for service with the French Navy. It was a conventional design for its day - a two-bay biplane with unstaggered wings, and engines mounted tractor-fashion on struts in the interplane gap. The pilot sat in an open cockpit, with a gunner in an open bow position, and another in an open position amidships.

Two examples, designated Latham 42 powered by liquid-cooled Vee engines were evaluated by the navy in 1924, leading to a contract for 18 aircraft powered by air-cooled radial engines instead. Designated Latham 43 by the manufacturer and HB.3 in naval service (for Hydravion de bombardement - "Seaplane-bomber", 3 seats), they remained in service between 1926 and 1929.

Eight other machines with the original liquid-cooled engine were sold to Poland.

Variants
 prototypes with Lorraine 12Da engines (2 built)
 production version for France with Gnome et Rhône 9Aa engines (18 built)
 production version for Poland with Lorraine engines (8 built)

Operators

Aéronavale
Escadrille 4R1
Escadrille 5R1

Polish Naval Aviation
Morski Dywizjon Lotniczy based at Puck

Specifications (French production version)

See also

References

Bibliography

Further reading

External links
 aviafrance.com

1920s French bomber aircraft
Flying boats
Latham aircraft
Biplanes
Twin piston-engined tractor aircraft
Aircraft first flown in 1924